The Poelaert family is a Brussels bourgeois family famous for its architects and sculptors. Its most notable member is Joseph Poelaert, architect of the law courts of Brussels.

See also 

 Bourgeois of Brussels

Notes and references

Further reading 

 1966: Jaack Ockeley, Een oude geslacht uit het land van Asse: de familie ROBIJNS, extract from "Vlaamse Stam" 1966. (Alliance Poelaert-Robijns)
 1973: Jos De Belder, "De sociale oorsprong van de Brusselse gegoede burgerij van 1914", in Revue Belge d'Histoire contemporaine, Brussels, 1973. See p. 422 and 413, concerning Jacques Poelaert (sic actually Albert Poelaert), and the Poelaert-Jacobs-Opdenbosch family.
 Guy Waltenier, "Les Quartiers généalogiques de Joseph Poelaert", in: l'Intermédiaire des Généalogistes, 196/223.

Belgian families